The 2017 IWBF Men's European Championship was the 23rd edition of the European Wheelchair Basketball Championship held in Tenerife, Spain  from 21 June to 30 June 2017.

Squads
Each of the 12 teams selected a squad of 12 players for the tournament.

Athletes are given an eight-level-score specific to wheelchair basketball, ranging from 0.5 to 4.5. Lower scores represent a higher degree of disability  The sum score of all players on the court cannot exceed 14.

Preliminary round
All times local (UTC+02:00)

Group A

Group B

Knockout stage

5-8

9-12

Final standings

All Star Team

References

European Wheelchair Basketball Championship
2017 in wheelchair basketball
2016–17 in Spanish basketball
2016–17 in European basketball
International basketball competitions hosted by Spain
Wheelchair basketball in Spain
Sport in Tenerife
June 2017 sports events in Europe